The 1964 VFL Grand Final was an Australian rules football game contested between the Collingwood Football Club and Melbourne Football Club, held at the Melbourne Cricket Ground in Melbourne on 19 September 1964. It was the 67th annual Grand Final of the Victorian Football League, staged to determine the premiers for the 1964 VFL season. The match, attended by 102,471 spectators, was won by Melbourne by a margin of 4 points, marking the club's 12th premiership victory.

This would be the last premiership won by Melbourne until 2021.

Background
Melbourne were competing in the finals for the 11th consecutive season. They were also playing in their eighth Grand Final in 11 seasons and fighting for their sixth Premiership in that time.

Match summary
With Melbourne leading by 11 points at the final break, the match is remembered for its thrilling last quarter. In the early stages, Melbourne had plenty of opportunities to kick goals but could only manage behinds, and it was Collingwood's Des Tuddenham who kicked the first goal of the term.

Seventeen minutes into the quarter, Collingwood trailed by 9 points but were within a kick when Ray Gabelich kicked a goal from a boundary throw-in. Gabelich kicked another to put them in front soon afterwards, a goal that is now regarded as one of the most famous in grand final history. He had received the ball near centre half-forward, and, due to Melbourne having spent the previous minutes in their own forward line and Collingwood moving the ball upfield quickly, there were no defenders ahead of Gabelich. A 109 kg ruckman, Gabelich ran towards the goal, bounced the ball four times, nearly losing it on each occasion, and, with Melbourne players gaining on him, put it through the big sticks to take the lead in one of the VFL/AFL's most memorable Grand Final moments.

Collingwood were now 3 points up and time-on was nearing. After the restart, Melbourne's Barry Bourke kicked the ball into their 50-metre arc, and it was marked by rover Hassa Mann. He was directly in front and only 20 metres out, but his shot for goal came off the side of his boot and could only manage a behind. Melbourne had another chance to win the game, however, when they kicked the ball towards the goal square. A big pack of players went for the ball, but it spilled to the ground, and Melbourne defender Neil Crompton gathered the ball and kicked a goal. It was his only goal of the season, and he had only been forward because he'd followed his opponent upfield.

In the final minutes, Collingwood had the ball in their forward line. Collingwood's Ian Graham had a chance to goal with a difficult snap from the boundary but missed. Melbourne held on against intense pressure from Collingwood until the siren sounded, leaving Melbourne winners by 4 points.

Teams

Umpire: Ron Brophy

Statistics

Score

Goalkickers
Melbourne:
 Townsend 3
 Lord 2
 Bourke 1
 Crompton 1
 Mann 1

Collingwood:
 Gabelich 2
 Bone 1
 Dalton 1
 Graham 1
 Steer 1
 Tuddenham 1
 Waters 1

For a long time, Terry Waters was credited with two goals in the grand final. In January 2020, historians reviewed the game and determined that one of Waters goals had been scored by Ian Graham instead, and the scorecard was amended. Waters admitted that he did not remember kicking one of his goals. Prior to the change, Waters was recognised as the outright leading Collingwood goalkicker for the year, with 43 goals, but the change brought a tie between Waters and Graham, on 42 apiece.

External links
Fullpointsfooty article on the Grand Final
 https://www.afl.com.au/news/367994/history-rewritten-the-remarkable-story-of-the-grand-final-goal-that-wasn-t

See also
 1964 VFL season

References

VFL/AFL Grand Finals
Grand
Melbourne Football Club
Collingwood Football Club